Barobata is a monotypic moth genus in the subfamily Lymantriinae. Its only species, Barobata trocta, is found in Togo and what was then the Cameroons. Both the genus and the species were first described by Ferdinand Karsch in 1895.

References

Lymantriinae
Monotypic moth genera